Sun Yung Shin (born 1974) is a Korean American poet, writer, consultant, and educator living in Minneapolis, Minnesota.

She is the editor of "A Good Time for the Truth: Race in Minnesota" (Minnesota Historical Society Press, 2016), author of "The Wet Hex" (Coffee House Press 2022), "Unbearable Splendor" (Coffee House Press 2016), Rough, and Savage (Coffee House Press, 2012), Skirt Full of Black (Coffee House Press, 2007), and the bilingual (English/Korean) illustrated children's book Cooper's Lesson (Children's Book Press, imprint of Lee & Low Books). She was an editor with Jane Jeong Trenka and Julia Chinyere Oparah for Outsiders Within: Writing on Transracial Adoption (South End Press, 2006), the first international anthology on the politics of transracial adoption edited by transracial adoptees. Outsiders Within: Writing on Transracial Adoption was released in a Korean-language edition by KoRoot Press in Seoul, South Korea, in 2012.

Biography
Shin was born in Seoul, South Korea, and was adopted when she was 13 months during the second big wave of the adoption of Asian children. She was adopted by a white couple and was raised and grew up in Chicago.

She attended Boston University for one year and then transferred to Macalester College in St. Paul, Minnesota and graduated cum laude with a degree in English. After graduating, she worked for a technology companies whose clients included United Health, The US Navy, and Pillsbury to pay off her college loans and pursue a master's degree. While in the process of obtaining her master's degree in teaching from the University of St. Thomas, she took a course on adolescent literature from playwright John Fenn. He liked a poem she wrote and took it home for his partner Jill Breckenridge to read. She loved it and encouraged Shin to continue writing poetry. Afterwards, she became the poetry editor of the campus literary magazine for Macalester College. From 2001 to 2002, Shin was in SASE: The Write Place mentor program with Minnesota poet Mark Nowak. Through the Loft's program, she was mentored by Wang Ping.

Shin has worked teaching literature, media reform and creative writing at the Perpich Center for Arts Education. She also taught composition and creative writing at the University of Minnesota, Macalester College, Hamline University, University of St. Thomas, The College of St. Catherine, The Loft Literary Center and Intermedia Arts/SASE: The Write Place. She taught English as second language and has been a guest artist in many inner city schools in the Minneapolis-St Paul. She was also involved in the now defunct Asian American Renaissance and as a board member on many other community organizations.

Shin presents her work frequently in the Twin Cities, and her poems have appeared in journals such as Indiana Review, Swerve, Court Green, Mid-American Review, Sonora Review, Capilano Review and Xcp cross-cultural poetics.

Awards and honors
Shin won the Asian American Literary Award in 2008 for her book of poems Skirt Full of Black. Shin's essays and fiction are anthologized in Fiction on a Stick (Milkweed), Riding Shotgun (Borealis), Transforming a Rape Culture (Milkweed), Echoes Upon Echoes: New Korean American Writings (Temple University), The Encyclopedia Project Vol. 1, A-E, Vol. 2, F - K, and The Adoption Encyclopedia (Greenwood Publishing). She also received the Minnesota Book Award in 2017 for her book Unbearable Splendor.

She is a recipient of grants and awards from the (Archibald) Bush Foundation, two time award recipient of Minnesota State Arts Board, Blacklock Nature Sanctuary, and The Loft Literary Center, and recipient of an artist's grant from the McKnight Foundation. She is also a 2022 MacDowell Residency Fellow.

Publications

Poems in journals
 A Mortal Fantasy (Axe Factory Review, Issue 12, Print) (Fall, 2000)
 The Wolveish Forage (DUSIE, Online) (July, 2017)
 Immigrant Song (Poetry Foundations, Online) (June, 2017)
 Woven Through with Snakes (The Cultural Society, Online) (June, 2017)

Essays / non-fiction in anthologies 
 "Harness" (Others Will Enter the Gates, New York, Print) (2014)

Essays in journals and other media
 Afterword for Asian/American Curricular Epistemicide: From Being Excluded to Becoming Model Minority (Sense Publishing, The Netherlands, Print) (2016)

Poems in special editions and venues
 Empty Ring, Nest Fire (Poem-a-Day, Academy of American Poets) (November 23, 2015)

Literary criticism
 Human Acts (Star Tribune, by Han Kang) (January 13. 2017)

References

Sources 
 Cooper's Lesson : 쿠퍼의 레슨 
 Outsiders Within: Writing on Transracial Adoption
 Outsiders Within: Writing on Transracial Adoption
 A Good Time for the Truth: Race in Minnesota
 My Singularity
 Valley,Uncanny
  Sun Yung Shin

External links
Sun Yung Shin's official website
This Spectral Evidence, a literary journal edited by Sun Yung Shin
A review of Rough, and Savage
A review of Skirt Full of Black
An interview with Sun Yung Shin by Asian American Press
An entry on Sun Yung Shin at Winter Red Press
An interview with Sun Yung Shin about Outsiders Within for The Twin Cities Daily Planet
The 11th Annual Asian American Literary Awards

American writers of Korean descent
American women poets
American poets
Writers from Chicago
1974 births
Living people
South Korean emigrants to the United States
American women journalists
21st-century American poets
Artists from Minnesota
21st-century American women writers
People from Seoul